Marie Henriette or Maria Henrietta may refer to:

 Marie Henriette of Austria (1836–1902), Queen of the Belgians as the wife of Leopold II
 Archduchess Maria Henrietta of Austria (1883–1956), Prince of Hohenlohe-Schillingsfürst

See also 
 Henriette Marie (disambiguation)